John Reid (born 9 September 1949) is a Scottish former music manager, known for being the manager and former lover of singer Elton John, as well as for managing the British rock band Queen.

Life and career 
Reid was born in Paisley, Renfrewshire, Scotland, the son of John Reid, a welder, and Betty, a shop worker. Apart from three years in New Zealand, he was brought up in the Gallowhill district of Paisley. He attended St Mirin's Academy, where he was a fellow pupil with singers Gerry Rafferty and Joe Egan. At the age of 16 he attended Stow College in Glasgow where he studied marine engineering, but dropped out to move to London in 1967.

Reid began his music management career in 1967 at the age of 18 as a promoter for EMI. At the age of 19, he became the Tamla Motown label manager for the UK. In 1971, Reid set up his own company with a few hundred pounds in savings and a £5,000 loan.

In 1970, Reid met Elton John, then known as Reg Dwight, at a Motown Christmas party. They moved in with each other, and began a romantic relationship as well as a business one, as John became Reid's first client. Their personal relationship ended after five years, but he remained John's manager until 1998. Their professional relationship ended over a leaked letter detailing John's spending, which was found by Benjamin Pell and published in the Daily Mirror. The ending of their business relationship in 1998 led to a legal action in 2000. Reid settled out of court by paying John £3.4 million. Reid's company earned more than £73 million from representing John between 1970 and 1998.

In 1974, in New Zealand, in a widely reported incident, Reid threw champagne in the face of a party host and punched the Auckland model and journalist Judith Baragwanath in the face when she came to the man's defence, sending her to the floor. Later the same night, he was involved in an altercation with a second journalist at a nightclub. He was convicted and sentenced to a month in prison for assault, and settled with Baragwanath for NZ $2500. Between 1975 and 1978, Reid was the manager of British rock group Queen.

In 1994, he was the manager for Irish dancer Michael Flatley. After Flatley left Riverdance and ended his relationship with Reid, Flatley paid Reid approximately £1 million to settle a wrongful termination lawsuit. Reid retired from management in 1999. In 2005 and 2006, Reid was a judge on the Australian version of The X Factor alongside Mark Holden and Kate Ceberano.

In 1998, Reid sold his art collection, estimated to have been worth £2 million.

In popular culture 
Reid was portrayed by Aidan Gillen in the 2018 Queen biopic Bohemian Rhapsody, and by Richard Madden in the 2019 Elton John biopic Rocketman. Both actors are known for their previous roles in the television series, Game of Thrones.

References 

1949 births
Living people
Businesspeople from Paisley, Renfrewshire
Elton John
Gay businessmen
Scottish gay men
People educated at St Mirin's Academy
Queen (band)
Scottish expatriates in Australia
Scottish music managers
Scottish television personalities
Scottish LGBT businesspeople